Mount Jamroga is a mountain,  high, located  east of Mount Gow in the rugged heights between Carryer Glacier and Sledgers Glacier, in the Bowers Mountains of Antarctica. It was mapped by the United States Geological Survey from surveys and U.S. Navy air photos, 1960–64, and was named by the Advisory Committee on Antarctic Names for Lieutenant Commander John J. Jamroga, a photographic officer with the U.S. Naval Support Force in 1967 and 1968. The topographical feature lies situated on the Pennell Coast, a portion of Antarctica lying between Cape Williams and Cape Adare.

References

Mountains of Victoria Land
Pennell Coast